Caleb West may refer to:

 Caleb Walton West (1844–1909), Governor of Utah Territory 
 Caleb West (novel), an 1898 novel by Francis Hopkinson Smith